Osman Cemal Kaygılı (4 October 1890, in Istanbul – 9 January 1945) was Turkish writer and journalist.

He started writing at Eşek magazine in 1910. In 1925 he started teaching Turkish language at Istanbul Imam Hatip school and later at Çemberlitaş Boys' School.

In 1931 he started writing at Yeni Gün magazine. His notes were published in a column named Corners and parishes of Istanbul. After that, he wrote latest telegraph column in the Akşam, İkdam, Cumhuriyet, Son Saat and Açıksöz magazines.

Works

Novels
 Çingeneler – 1939
 Aygır Fatma – 1944
 Bekri Mustafa – 1944

Plays
 Üfürükçü – 1925
 İstanbul Revüsü – 1925
 Mezarlık Kızı – 1927

Books about him 
 Mustafa Apaydın, Osman Cemal Kaygılı'nın Hikâyeciliği, Boğaziçi Üniversitesi Yayınevi, 2006.

Footnotes

References

External links
 

Journalists from Istanbul
Writers from Istanbul
1945 deaths
1890 births